is a Japanese shōnen manga series written and illustrated by Shinji Tonaka. It has been serialized in Monthly Shōnen Rival since May 2008. Tankōbon volumes containing four chapters are published by Kodansha. The first tankōbon of the series was released in August 2008 and the latest in December 2012.

References

Baseball in anime and manga
Shōnen manga